Sábado à Noite is the second studio album by Brazilian music duo Sandy & Junior, released by Philips and PolyGram on 1992. The album follows the same musical style as the predecessor: sertanejo and country music. The photos of the album cover and album were made in Nashville, Tennessee, a stronghold of country in the United States. There are also two artists on the album: Ney Matogrosso in "O Vira" and Chitãozinho & Xororó in the song "Vamos Construir". Also part of this album is one of the greatest successes of the pair; "A Resposta da Mariquinha", which became a single and the album's best-known song.

Although sources claim that the album received the gold record, with sales around 310,000 copies, the album received no certification from Pro-Música Brasil (PMB).

Track listing

References

External links 
 Sábado à Noite at Discogs

Sandy & Junior albums
1992 albums
Children's music albums by Brazilian artists
Portuguese-language albums